The Cuban Baseball Hall of Fame (Salón de la Fama del Béisbol Cubano) is a hall of fame that honors eminent baseball players from Cuban baseball. Established in 1939 to honor players, managers, and umpires in the pre-revolution Cuban League, by 1961 it had honored 68 players, managers, and umpires whose names are shown on a marble plaque at Havana's Estadio Latinoamericano. After the revolution, however, the Hall of Fame languished for more than 50 years, seldom mentioned or acknowledged and with no new inductees. Following a campaign led by Cuban filmmaker Ian Padrón, a meeting was held on November 7–8, 2014 to reformulate the Hall of Fame and to propose a museum in which it would be housed. The reformulated Hall recognized the original 68 members, and a jury of 25 people selected 10 new inductees—five from the pre-revolution period and five representing for the first time the post-revolution Cuban National Series. The planned site for the new museum is in the José Antonio Echeverría Workers' Social Club (also known as the Vedado Tennis Club).

History

Pre-revolution (1939–1961)
The Cuban Baseball Hall of Fame was established by the DGND (Dirección General Nacional de Deportes), a government agency supervising sports activities in Cuba. The hall was inaugurated on July 26, 1939—about six weeks after the June 12 dedication and opening of the U.S. National Baseball Hall of Fame and Museum in Cooperstown—by placing a bronze plaque at Havana's La Tropical Stadium. The first ten inductees were selected by former and current baseball writers and the DGND's baseball advisers (asesores de baseball). The inaugural class included 19th-century Cuban stars (Antonio María García, Valentín González, Adolfo Luján, and Carlos Royer), black players who had achieved success in the U.S. Negro leagues (Luis Bustamante, José de la Caridad Méndez, Gervasio González, and Cristóbal Torriente), and white players who had played Major League Baseball (Rafael Almeida and Armando Marsans). Méndez and Torriente, along with later inductee Martín Dihigo, subsequently were also recognized by the U.S. Hall of Fame.

The bronze plaque was subsequently replaced by a marble plaque that hangs on a wall "in a poorly lit corner" of Havana's Estadio Latinoamericano. Before listing the names of the inductees, the introductory section of the plaque reads, 
Cuban Professional Baseball Hall of Fame
List of players that have been selected as
BASEBALL IMMORTALS
And have deserved this just recognition for their distinguished work
maintaining an undying memory of what they were in this
sport
While all of the inductees were recognized as baseball players, in several cases their distinction reflected, at least in part, accomplishments achieved after their playing careers. For example, Emilio Sabourín, Agustín Molina, and José Rodríguez were long-time managers who won championships, as also were more celebrated players such as Dihigo, Miguel Angel González, Adolfo Luque, and Marsans. Francisco A. Poyo and Eustaquio Gutiérrez served as umpires. Carlos Zaldo, Eugenio Jiménez, and Molina entered the business side of baseball as stadium developer, promoter, and league administrator. Wenceslao Gálvez wrote a history of baseball in Cuba, published in 1889, which according to Roberto González Echevarría "may very well be the first history of the game ever written anywhere".

Other inductees achieved distinction outside of baseball. For example, Juan Antiga, who played in the Cuban League for just two seasons prior to completing medical school, became a notable intellectual, homeopath, government official, and diplomat, serving as ambassador to Switzerland and delegate to the League of Nations. The type of post-playing distinction most often recognized by the hall, however, is military service, especially during the Cuban War of Independence that was fought from 1895 to 1898. Alfredo Arango, Eduardo Machado, and Carlos Maciá served as officers in the Cuban revolutionary army and Sabourín, Juan Manuel Pastoriza, and Ricardo Cabaleiro died in the conflict.

In the 20th century, opportunities to play in the United States became increasingly important to Cuban players. Some of the earliest opportunities to play in the U.S. came in nearby Key West beginning about 1890. Key West had an independent baseball league with considerable participation by Cuban emigrants, and Cuban League players were recruited to play there during the off season. Cuban Baseball Hall of Fame inductees Molina and Poyo began their baseball careers in Key West before moving on to the Cuban League. In 1899, a Cuban all-star team, the All Cubans, undertook their first barnstorming tour of the United States. The team, which was racially integrated (reflecting the racial integration of the Cuban League) played against professional and semi-professional teams, white and black, until 1905. 

However, the U.S. color line soon affected Cuban players. By 1904, white Cubans, such as Juan Violá, were playing in the minor leagues, and in 1911 Rafael Almeida and Armando Marsans broke into the majors with the Cincinnati Reds. Meanwhile, Cubans with darker complexions played in the Negro leagues for teams such as the Cuban Stars (West), the Cuban Stars (East), and the New York Cubans. Some Cuban players moved on to success with U.S. teams, such as José Méndez with the Kansas City Monarchs and Cristóbal Torriente with the Chicago American Giants.

Exile in Florida (1962–1986, 1997–1998) 
After the closing of the Cuban League in 1961, inductions to the Cuban Baseball Hall of Fame ceased in Havana for more than five decades. The players who had migrated to the United States, however, formed an organization, the Federation of Professional Cuban Baseball Players in Exile (Federación de Peloteros Profesionales Cubanos en el Exilio) which held elections in Miami to add new members to the hall. These additional members are not universally recognized; they are not recognized in Cuba, nor are they included in lists of Hall of Fame inductees shown in reference books by historians Peter Bjarkman and Jorge Figueredo. The Miami elections continued in three phases—1962–1986, 1997–1998, and 2007—ultimately declaring more than 200 additional individuals as inductees.

Official reformulation (2014–present) 
In August 2014, Cuban filmmaker and baseball fan Ian Padrón brought together a group of 12 prominent fans to create a group called Enthusiasts for the Refoundation of the Cuban Baseball Hall of Fame. The group developed a set of rules to govern a reformulated hall which would recognize the 68 original members, provide for regular elections of additional professional and amateur players from both the pre-revolution and post-revolution periods, and would help arrange for the hall to be part of a Cuban baseball museum. With support from the National Institute of Sport, Physical Education, and Recreation (INDER), a meeting of sports commentators was held on November 7–8, 2014. The meeting approved the draft rules, selected a jury of 25 people to select the inductees, and planned for subsequent annual elections. Four players and an umpire were honored from the pre-revolution era—Conrado (Connie) Marrero, Orestes (Minnie) Miñoso, Camilo Pascual, Esteban (Steve) Bellán, and umpire Amado Maestri. Five players were also honored the post-revolution era, the first players from that period to be recognized—Omar Linares, Orestes Kindelán, Antonio Muñoz, Luis Casanova, and Braudilio Vinent.

Inductees

See also
Baseball awards#Cuba

Notes

References

.
.
.

.

.

External links
Cuban Baseball Hall of Fame at Baseball-Almanac.com

Baseball
Baseball museums and halls of fame
Lists of baseball players
Museums established in 1939
Awards established in 1939
1939 establishments in Cuba
Awards disestablished in 1961
Halls of fame in Florida
Baseball in Cuba
Baseball in Florida
Awards established in 1962
Awards established in 2014
Cuba–United States relations
1961 disestablishments in Cuba
1962 establishments in Florida
2014 establishments in Florida